Waikura is a genus of very small sea snails, pyramidellid gastropod mollusks, or micromollusks. This genus is currently placed in the subfamily Chrysallidinae of the family Odostomiidae.

Shell description
The original description by Marwick (1931) says that the genus consists of small shells that are subconical with a telescopic spire. The protoconch is heterostrophic and immersed. The sculpture consists of tubercles on the shoulders that extends axially for a short distance. There are no spiral sculpture except on the subsutural border. The surface is smooth and polished. The aperture is subrhombic with a highly sinuous outer lip that is convex below. Columella has a week tooth at the top.

Life habits
Little is known about the biology of the members of this genus. As is true of most members of the Pyramidellidae sensu lato, they are probably ectoparasites.

Species
Species within the genus Waikura include:
 Waikura torques Marwick, 1931 (Type species)
 Waikura clivosa Marwick, 1931

References
 

Pyramidellidae

de:Pyramidelloidea